Mount McGuire may refer to:

 Mount McGuire (Alberta), a mountain in Jasper National Park, Canada
 Mount McGuire (Cascade Range), a mountain in British Columbia, Canada
 Mount McGuire (Cassiar Land District), a mountain in British Columbia, Canada
 Mount McGuire (Idaho), a mountain in Idaho, USA
 Mount McGuire (Yukon), a mountain in Yukon, Canada

See also
 Mount Maguire, Antarctica